Michael Abram Bergmann (born 1964) is an American analytic philosopher teaching in the department of philosophy at Purdue University. His primary interests are epistemology and philosophy of religion. In epistemology, he writes mostly on externalism and, in philosophy of religion, he mostly writes on the epistemology of religious belief and the problem of evil.

Biography 
Born in 1964, Bergmann received Bachelor of Arts and Master of Arts degrees in philosophy from the University of Waterloo and, in 1997, a PhD from the University of Notre Dame. He has taught at Purdue University since 1997. Bergmann was the president of the Society of Christian Philosophers from 2016 to 2019.

Philosophical work 

In his early work, Bergmann wrote about Alvin Plantinga's evolutionary argument against naturalism. He raised objections inspired by Thomas Reid's epistemology. In philosophy of religion, Bergmann, along with other philosophers, developed skeptical theism, a position which addresses the evidential argument from evil formulated by William L. Rowe. With Michael Rea and Michael Murray, he edited the book Divine Evil? The Moral Character of the God of Abraham (Oxford University Press, 2010).

In epistemology, Bergmann defends externalism.

Works 
 Justification Without Awareness: A Defense of Epistemic Externalism, Oxford University Press, 2006.

References 

1964 births
21st-century American philosophers
American Christian writers
Analytic philosophers
Christian philosophers
Christians from Indiana
Critics of atheism
Epistemologists
Living people
Metaphysicians
Philosophers from Indiana
Philosophers of religion
Presidents of the Society of Christian Philosophers
Purdue University faculty
University of Notre Dame alumni
University of Waterloo alumni